Anastasiya Komardina and Elitsa Kostova were the defending champions, but both players chose not to participate.

An-Sophie Mestach and Zheng Saisai won the title after defeating Prarthana Thombare and Eva Wacanno 3–6, 6–2, [10–7] in the final.

Seeds

Draw

Draw

References
Main Draw

Grand Est Open 88 - Doubles